The 2014 National Pro Fastpitch season was the 11th season of professional softball under the name National Pro Fastpitch (NPF) for  the only professional women's softball league in the United States.  From 1997 to 2002, NPF operated under the names Women's Pro Fastpitch (WPF) and Women's Pro Softball League (WPSL).  Each year, the playoff teams battle for the Cowles Cup. Play began on May 30 in Salisbury, Maryland, between the Pennsylvania Rebellion and the USSSA Pride.

Milestones and events
The NY/NJ Comets did not play in 2014, and their roster and draft positions were inherited by an expansion team, Pennsylvania Rebellion. The Rebellion played home games in Washington, Pennsylvania in Consol Energy Park.

NPF reached a deal with CBS Sports Network to broadcast selected regular season games and selected postseason games for the 2014 season.

Rule changes
At its owners' meetings, NPF announced a number of changes in policies and game rules:

Game rules:
 Voted to keep the International Tie Breaker during regular season play. The tie breaker will continue to be implemented in the top of the 10th inning.  This effectively reverses a change announced in 2013.
 Voted to reject a "Run Rule" that would end the game after 5 innings (4 1/2 if home team was ahead) if a team led by 12 or more runs
 Voted to implement a "90 second" clock between innings. After the clock expires, umpires will assign a ball on the batter for "delay of game".
 Voted to revise the number of defensive conferences from one per inning to three per game. In extra innings, teams will be given one additional conference per inning. Violation will result in ejection of the head coach.
 Committee voted to eliminate a former revision,  and essentially gives the pitcher 25 seconds to get in place on the rubber, take the sign and deliver the pitch.

Policies and procedures:
 Voted to eliminate the Disabled List 
 Voted to increase the maximum roster limit from 20 to 23 (Salary cap did not increase)
 Voted to increase the minimum roster limit from 14 to 18.
 Voted for a 45-minute autograph session following all games except double headers. The session is mandatory for all players.
 Voted for a ticket policy that would allow fifty complementary tickets total (between both teams) per game. The Home Team will be given first choice with a 2 ticket per player allowance with the remaining tickets (if any) offered to the Visiting Team. It is at the discretion of the Home Team whether to make discounted tickets available to Visiting Team Players.
 Voted for a new payment structure for umpires in the event a game is split in its completion either due to weather or other reason.
 Voted to re-structure of the umpire assignment and evaluation system for the league. 
 Voted for a contract with the company "Game Changer" to carry the complete stats of the NPF

Post season:
 Voted to require a minimum number of innings, plate appearances, or total games played, to be considered for post season award nominations and voting. Those minimums are: Defensive player nominees must have played a minimum of 75% of the total innings possible, at the position they are being nominated for. Utility will require the player to have played in 75% of total innings possible, but with no stipulation on position. Offensive player nominees must have 75% of total plate appearances possible based on their team statistics. There are no minimum criteria for the nominations of pitchers into any category that would pertain to the position of pitching.
 Voted to change the Championship Series format back to that used from 2010–2012. The top 4 league teams, according to regular season finish, advance to the Championship Series. Those 4 teams play three series of "best-of-three" match-ups. The #1 seed will play the #4 seed in a best-of-three series and the #2 seed will play the #3 seed in a best-of-three series, with both winners advancing to the Final Series. Those two winners will then compete in a best-of-three series to determine the Cowles Cup Champion. This format will add one day to the competition from the 2013 structure.

Teams, cities and stadiums

Player acquisition

College draft

The 2014 NPF College Draft was held on March 31 in Nashville, Tennessee at 8:00 pm EST at the Ford Theatre located inside the Country Music Hall of Fame and Museum.  Pitcher Dallas Escobedo of Arizona State was selected first by Pennsylvania Rebellion.

Notable transactions

Standings

NPF Championship Series

The top four teams from the regular season qualify for the championship playoffs. The highest-seeded semifinal winner then hosted the championship final.

Championship Game

League leaders
Final totals

Batting leaders

Pitching leaders

Annual awards

See also

 List of professional sports leagues
 List of professional sports teams in the United States and Canada

References

External links 
 

Softball teams
2014 in women's softball
2014 in American women's sports
Softball in the United States
Salisbury, Maryland